Calvin Magee (April 23, 1963May 20, 2022) was an American professional football player and college football coach. He played tight end for four seasons for the Tampa Bay Buccaneers of the National Football League (NFL) from 1985 to 1988.  

Shortly after a high school coaching career around the Tampa area, Calvin was a member of the University of South Florida's first coaching staff in 1996 where he remained until 2001 when he joined Rich Rodriguez's staff at West Virginia University. Magee followed Rodriguez to the University of Michigan in 2008, where he served as offensive coordinator until Rodriguez and his staff were fired after the 2010 season.

Rodriguez is widely credited with innovating the spread option offense, which Magee managed at West Virginia and Michigan.  This offense is used by thousands of high schools and other collegiate programs throughout the country.  Magee was a finalist for the Broyles Award in 2007, given to the top college assistant coach.

Following Rich Rodriguez's termination as Michigan's head football coach, Magee joined Todd Graham's staff on the Pittsburgh Panthers football team. He served as offensive coordinator for the 2011 season.

On December 5, 2011, Rich Rodriguez announced that Magee would join his staff at the University of Arizona as offensive coordinator. He was also the running backs coach.

On January 20, 2018, Magee became the offensive coordinator and running backs coach at the University of New Mexico.

On January 2, 2019, Magee became the tight ends coach at the University of Mississippi. 

Magee died on May 20, 2022, following a heart attack.

References

External links
 Arizona Wildcats bio

1963 births
2022 deaths
American football tight ends
Arizona Wildcats football coaches
Duke Blue Devils football coaches
Jacksonville State Gamecocks football coaches
Michigan Wolverines football coaches
Pittsburgh Panthers football coaches
South Florida Bulls football coaches
Ole Miss Rebels football coaches
Southern Jaguars football players
Tampa Bay Buccaneers players
West Virginia Mountaineers football coaches
High school football coaches in Florida
Sportspeople from New Orleans
Players of American football from New Orleans